Thabanchuia is an extinct genus of dvinosaurian temnospondyl within the family Tupilakosauridae. It is known from the Lystrosaurus Assemblage Zone in Thaba N'chu, Free State, South Africa. The genus contains just one species, Thabanchuia oomie, the type species.

See also

 Prehistoric amphibian
 List of prehistoric amphibians

References

Dvinosaurs
Triassic amphibians
Early Triassic amphibians of Africa
Fossil taxa described in 1998